Marcello Craca (born 27 October 1974) is a former professional tennis player from Germany.

Personal
Craca was born to an Italian father and German mother.

Career
Craca made his Grand Slam debut in the 1997 Wimbledon Championships, where he lost to reigning champion Richard Krajicek in the opening round. He made the quarter-finals of the 1997 Prague Open, in a run which included a win over world number four Yevgeny Kafelnikov.

In 1998 he appeared in both the Australian Open and French Open. He lost in the first round at each event, to David Wheaton in Australia and to Christophe Van Garsse in the France Open. The German was a quarter-finalist in Orlando that year.

Challenger Titles

Singles: (1)

References

1974 births
Living people
German male tennis players
Sportspeople from Pforzheim
German people of Italian descent
Tennis people from Baden-Württemberg